Bhairabkunda is a popular picnic spot in Udalguri district in the State of Assam, India. It is situated on the border of Bhutan.

The Jampani River, originating in Bhutan, and Bhairabi River merge here to form Dhanshiri River. Dhanshiri river is a major tributary of Brahmaputra river. An irrigation project was constructed on Dhanshiri river at Bhairabkunda. A guide dam was constructed inside Bhutan for this project. The construction of the project took much more time than planned due to strong currents and terrorism. Udalguri, Rowta, Kalaigaon, Mazbat and Bechimari under Udalguri Civil Sub-Division.

Along with the irrigation project, a hydro-electric project was also planned to generate 20 MW of electricity out of 5 No. falls per  drop, but it did not materialise.

Geography 
Bhairabkunda has an average elevation of 703 metres. It stands as one of the famous picnic spots in Assam. Both locals and tourists are drawn towards this place because of its location and features. One attraction of the place is that it shares border with Bhutan and stands as a suitable entrypoint to the country. People can also cross the international border on foot from here and visit the adjacent Daifam town. There is also a suspension bridge made with steel cables that connects Bhairabkunda with Daifam, which is a tourist destination, and a spot for photography.

Tourist Places 
Bhairabkunda Picnic Spot- Thousands of picnickers visit this place through November to early February. 
Shiva Mandir- Significant Number of devotees visit this place throughout the year. The number, however, increases during special occasions.
Gethsemane Man-made Forest- A forest grown entirely by local JFMC of 35 members with the help of Forest department of Assam. Spread across more than 6 km2. With more than 14 lakh plus trees of over 35 varieties. A number of animals, birds and reptiles can also be seen here. Visitors can also stay the night in their Guest house.

Bhairabkunda Tourism Festival 
Bhairabkunda Tourism Festival is organised during the month of January every year. The event is organised in the bank of river Dhansiri and Bhairabkunda Tourism Complex. The main objective of this event is to promote tourism in the locality and to expose the vibrant local culture. The main attractions of this events are folk dance and music, traditional cuisines and traditional dresses shows from across the Northeast region as well as from Bhutan. Other activities in the event include elephant and Jeep safari as well.

References
Bhairabkunda Picnic Place

Gethsemane Man-made Forest JFMC 1

Further reading
Army celebrates International Day of Forests at 6 sq km manmade forest near Bhairabkunda. The Sentinel. 23 March 2019.

 
 
 
 
 
 "Flying Snakes of Gethsemane Forest. Gethsemane Man-made Forest. 26 May 2019.
 "Explore Bhairabkunda: 8 Things to See". Gethsemane Man-made Forest. 22 November 2018.

Villages in Udalguri district
Tourist attractions in Assam
Bhutan–India border